Ricardo Leonardo Ivoskus (born 10 January 1942) is an Argentinian lawyer and politician. He has served as mayor of General San Martín Partido, located in the northern suburbs of Buenos Aires, from 1999 till 2011.

References

Living people
1942 births
Argentine people of Lithuanian descent
20th-century Argentine lawyers
20th-century Argentine politicians
21st-century Argentine politicians
People from General San Martín Partido
Place of birth missing (living people)
Mayors of General San Martín Partido